Beledie Han is a settlement in Kostinbrod Municipality, Sofia Province (Western Bulgaria).

Geography 
Although shown separately on maps, since the Liberation of Bulgaria in 1878 the settlement has never been registered as a populated place according to Bulgaria's official regulations. Instead it is considered a part (mahala) of the nearby village Gradets, situated 1.4 kilometers east-southeast.

Beledie Han lies at altitude of 735 meters above sea level, located 11 kilometers north-northwest of the city of Kostinbrod, 18 km from Sofia Ring Road and 26 km from the center of Sofia. It is situated along Lomsko Road (Sofia – Petrohan Pass – Berkovitsa – Montana – Lom).

History 
The settlement originated near an old Roman road. Near the village, along the old Roman road, some ruins of an ancient settlement can still be found.

Various legends explain the name of the village. Some say it was named after the daughter Bella of an inn keeper. During the Ottoman rule, there was a municipal inn here (Turkish: belediye means "municipality"), where horse-drawn carriages replaced tired horses with rested ones. In the inn, passengers rested before climbing the mountain to the Petrohan Pass.

Events 
In the beginning of the summer, the music festival Lilac OpenAir is held in the area close to Lyulaka hut. 

Years ago the annual local 'sabor' gathering was organized on 2 June but the tradition faded after 1989.

Lyulaka hut 
The mountain hut Lyulaka is situated in Mala mountain (a part of Western Stara planina), 600 meters northeast from Beledie Han, 610 m above sea level. The hut has 35 beds, tourist kitchen and a canteen.

There are many caves (ca. 30) nearby the hut. The river Kriva flows by the hut and around many picturesque meadows suitable for picnics. It is believed that the area has buried gold and untold riches, which makes it interesting for treasure hunters.

References

External links 
 "Beledie han" tourist corner (in Bulgarian)
 Photos of Beledie han
 Rocks of Beledie han (in Bulgarian)

Populated places in Sofia Province